The High Commissioner of Malaysia to the Republic of Namibia is the head of Malaysia's diplomatic mission to Namibia. The position has the rank and status of an Ambassador Extraordinary and Plenipotentiary and is based in the High Commission of Malaysia, Windhoek.

List of heads of mission

High Commissioners to Namibia

See also
 Malaysia–Namibia relations

References 

 
Namibia
Malaysia